James M. Lyall (born June 25, 1952) is an American football coach and former player.  He was most recently the head football coach at Siena Heights University, a position he held from 2011 until May 2016.  Lyall was the head football coach at Adrian College from 1990 to 2009.  He played college football as a defensive tackle for the University of Michigan under head coach Bo Schembechler from 1970 to 1973.

Coaching career

Adrian
Lyall was the head football coach at Adrian College in Adrian, Michigan.  He held that position for 20 seasons, from 1990 until 2009.  His coaching record at Adrian was 97–92–1.

Lyall  was fired In November 2009.  The program had improved considerably over the previous eight years, with a vastly improved roster, a 55–25 record, and five runner-up finishes in the Michigan Intercollegiate Athletic Association.  Jim Deere, an assistant coach under Lyall, was hired as the new head coach.

Siena Heights
Lyall became the first head coach for the program at Siena Heights starting in the 2011 season. He retired from Siena Heights in May 2016 due to health concerns.

Head coaching record

References

External links
 Siena Heights profile

1952 births
Living people
American football defensive tackles
Adrian Bulldogs football coaches
Michigan Wolverines football players
Siena Heights Saints football coaches
Sportspeople from Cleveland
Players of American football from Cleveland